The Marcus Hobbs House is an historic house at 16 William Street in Worcester, Massachusetts.  Built in 1849, it is an example of mid-19th century Greek Revival housing with added Italianate features.  The house was listed on the National Register of Historic Places in 1980.

Description and history
The Marcus Hobbs House is located in a densely built residential area a short way west of downtown Worcester, on the north side of William Street west of Linden Street.  It is a -story wood frame structure, with a gabled roof and clapboarded exterior.  Its front facade is three bays wide, with the main entrance in the left bay flanked by sidelight windows.  A single-story porch extends across the front and around to the left side, supported by fluted Doric columns. The building corners have paneled pilasters, which rise to an entablature decorated with paired carved wooden brackets. The main gable has a round-arch window at its peak.

The house was built in 1849 by carpenter Marcus Hobbs and was originally in a Greek Revival style.  In about 1870 it was restyled with significant Italianate features, including the round-arch gable window, paired brackets in the eaves, and dentil molding.  The porch, originally limited to the front of the house, was probably also extended at that time.  Later owners of the property include Edward Hamilton, who founded the Mozart Society of Worcester.

See also
National Register of Historic Places listings in northwestern Worcester, Massachusetts
National Register of Historic Places listings in Worcester County, Massachusetts

References

Houses in Worcester, Massachusetts
Italianate architecture in Massachusetts
Houses completed in 1849
National Register of Historic Places in Worcester, Massachusetts
1849 establishments in Massachusetts
Houses on the National Register of Historic Places in Worcester County, Massachusetts